When I'm with You is a song released by Los Angeles band Sparks. The song relies on disco and new wave as its two main genres with rock guitars audible throughout the song. The song did not chart on any Billboard charts, but was Sparks’ only Top 40 single in Australia, where it peaked at number 14, whilst it peaked at number 1 in France for six weeks. It is not known who produced this song as Giorgio Moroder produced it alongside Harold Faltermeyer, with the latter claiming to have produced much of the album. Keith Forsey, best known as producer for Billy Idol in the 1980s and then resuming in 2006, and for writing several other works including "Don't You (Forget About Me)" and "Flashdance... What a Feeling" among others, played drums on the song. The B-side is an instrumental version of "When I'm with You".

Personnel
The following are purported to be on the song.

 Russell Mael – vocals
 Ron Mael – keyboards
 W. G. Snuffy Walden – guitar
 Richie Zito – bass guitar
 Harold Faltermeyer – keyboards
 Keith Forsey – drums
 Laurie Forsey – backing vocals

Charts

Weekly charts

Year-end charts

References

1980 singles
Sparks (band) songs
1979 songs